Liz Berry may refer to:

 Liz Berry (born 1980), a British poet.
 Liz Berry (politician) (born c.1983), a Washington state representative.

See also 

 Elizabeth Williams Berry (1854–1969), an Australian-born jockey.